James Bates Thomson (May 21, 1808-June 22, 1883) was an American mathematician, educator, and author

Thomson  was born in Springfield, Vt, May 21, 1808, the son of John and Elizabeth (Brown) Thomson. After several years' experience in teaching, he entered Yale College in 1829, but on completing the Freshman year was obliged to be absent on account of illness, and so fell back into the next class and graduated in 1834.

After taking his degree he spent one year in New Haven as a resident graduate, and then took charge of an academy in Nantucket, Mass., where he remained until 1842, when he resigned and removed to Auburn, N. Y. He was then entrusted by Yale President Jeremiah Day with the duty of abridging his treatise on Algebra, and for four or five years subsequently devoted himself to the organization and extension of Teachers' Institutes and similar gatherings.  He removed to the city of New York in 1846, where (and in Brooklyn) he spent the rest of his life, engaged to the last in the completion and revision of a series of mathematical works, which has met with considerable success. He received the degree of Doctor of Laws from Hamilton College in 1853, and again from the University of Tennessee in 1882. He removed his residence to Brooklyn in 1868, and for eight years before his decease was a great sufferer from rheumatism. He died in Brooklyn, June 22, 1883, in his 76th year.

He married, August 25, 1840, Mary Coffin, who survived him with their only child, a daughter. His great-grandson, Thomson Burtis was a prolific author of adventure stories for boys as well as several movie scripts.

External links

Works by Thomson

1808 births
1883 deaths
People from Springfield, Vermont
Yale College alumni
American male writers
19th-century American mathematicians